Silvanopsis is a genus of beetles in the family Silvanidae, containing the following species:

 Silvanopsis nepalensis Pal & Sen Gupta
 Silvanopsis raffrayi Grouvelle
 Silvanopsis simoni Grouvelle

References

Silvanidae genera